Dean Colin Stoneman (born July 24, 1990) is a British racing driver. Stoneman was the 2010 Formula Two champion.

Career

Like many drivers, Stoneman began his career in karting. He made his first steps in single-seaters in 2006 when he competed in selected rounds of the Formula Renault BARC. He raced in the series full-time in 2007, finishing as runner-up to Hywel Lloyd. He also finished sixth in the Formula Renault 2.0 UK Winter Series.

Stoneman moved to the main Formula Renault 2.0 UK championship in 2008 and took three wins on his way to fourth in the standings. He was also nominated for the McLaren Autosport BRDC Award. Stoneman finished fourth again in the standings in 2009, this time with just one race win.

Stoneman won the FIA Formula Two Championship in 2010, securing a test drive with the Williams F1 team at the end of the season. On the first day of the young drivers test in Abu Dhabi he set the fifth fastest time, just under two seconds slower than pacesetter Daniel Ricciardo.

In 2011 Stoneman had been planning to progress to the Formula Renault 3.5 series, joining fellow young driver tester Ricciardo at ISR Racing, but he was forced to skip the season after he was diagnosed with testicular cancer.

Stoneman spent 2012 competing in powerboat racing (his father, Colin, was a previous champion) as he regained fitness, winning the P1 SuperStock UK powerboat title in 2012. He returned to car racing in the 2013 Porsche Carrera Cup Great Britain season after recovering from his illness, winning both races on his debut weekend along with pole position in qualifying. Later in the season, Stoneman had accumulated too many points on his licence and was given a two race ban, which he served at the Rockingham race weekend. Stoneman returned to single-seater racing in late 2013 driving for Koiranen GP in the last two races of the 2013 GP3 Series season. Stoneman signed with Marussia Manor Racing for 2014 GP3 season. Stoneman drove for Manor in the first seven race weekends. Following Manor's folding four races before season's ending, Stoneman switched to Koiranen GP replacing Carmen Jordá. Stoneman finished second in the drivers championship.

In 2015, Stoneman moved to the Formula Renault 3.5 Series with DAMS having picked up the backing of the Red Bull Junior Team. Stoneman finished sixth overall in the Formula Renault 3.5 scoring 130 points. Stoneman joined GP2 series with Carlin for the last three events of the 2015 season. Stoneman finished GP2 season 24th overall with one point.

In 2016 Stoneman moved to Indy Lights driving for Andretti Autosport. He finished fifth in the Indy Lights championship. In addition to competing in Indy Lights, Stoneman tested an Andretti Dallara IR12 Indycar in August of that year.

In March 2017 Strakka Racing announced that Stoneman would race for them in 2017, sharing a McLaren 650 GT3 with Andrew Watson and Jazeman Jaafar in the 2017 Blancpain GT Series Endurance Cup.

Personal life
He went to school at Wyvern College, Eastleigh.

Racing record

Career summary

Complete FIA Formula Two Championship results
(key) (Races in bold indicate pole position) (Races in italics indicate fastest lap)

Complete Formula Renault 3.5 Series results
(key) (Races in bold indicate pole position) (Races in italics indicate fastest lap)

Complete GP3 Series results
(key) (Races in bold indicate pole position) (Races in italics indicate fastest lap)

† Driver did not finish the race, but was classified as he completed over 90% of the race distance.

Complete GP2 Series results
(key) (Races in bold indicate pole position) (Races in italics indicate fastest lap)

American open-wheel racing results

Indy Lights

Complete FIA World Endurance Championship results
(key) (Races in bold indicate pole position; races in italics indicate fastest lap)

References

External links
 

1990 births
Living people
People from Croydon
English racing drivers
Formula Renault BARC drivers
British Formula Renault 2.0 drivers
FIA Formula Two Championship drivers
World Series Formula V8 3.5 drivers
GP3 Series drivers
Indy Lights drivers
British motorboat racers
GP2 Series drivers
Porsche Carrera Cup GB drivers
Carlin racing drivers
Manor Motorsport drivers
Koiranen GP drivers
DAMS drivers
Andretti Autosport drivers
Strakka Racing drivers
Ombra Racing drivers
Blancpain Endurance Series drivers
FIA World Endurance Championship drivers
Lamborghini Super Trofeo drivers